Laksmi Rodríguez de la Sierra Solórzano (born November 19, 1985 in San Cristóbal) is a Venezuelan model and Miss Venezuela International 2008. She competed in the Miss International 2009 beauty pageant.

She represented Monagas state.

She stands 178 cm (5'10") and her measurements are 90-61-90.

Laksmi also participated in the Miss Supranational 2010 competition, where she managed to advance to the final ten, finally occupying the sixth position.

Life and career

Early life 
Rodríguez studied Social Communication at the Santa María University, in Caracas.

Pageantry

Miss Venezuela 2008 
Rodríguez was selected to represent the Monagas state in Miss Venezuela 2008. Competing with 27 other candidates. At the end of the event, on September 10, 2008, at the Poliedro de Caracas, she was crowned by her predecessor, Dayana Colmenares, as Miss Venezuela International 2008.

In addition, the designer Gionni Straccia, won the award for Best Design in Evening Dress, which was awarded for the first time in the history of the contest; this thanks to the creation carried by Laksmi in the final night.

Miss International 2009 
Rodríguez represented Venezuela at Miss International 2009.

Miss Supranational 2010 
After this, the Miss Venezuela Organization in conjunction with Osmel Sousa, decided to select her to represent the country at Miss Supranational 2010.

Rodríguez finally represented Venezuela in the Miss Supranational 2010 pageant.

Personal life
She has been in a long-term relationship with the Chilean singer, Beto Cuevas, former vocalist of La Ley; It was even stated that they were together even when he was a partner of the actress Bárbara Mori and the latter in turn of Elías Wehbe, who died.

On Thursday, April 11, 2013, while she and a companion were going to their residence in Bello Monte, Caracas, they were intercepted by a group of antisocials who shot the vehicle in which they were.

In the event, Rodríguez is shot in the chest from which she would recover satisfactorily. However, her friend died hours later in the hospital.

See also
 Stefanía Fernández
 Maria Milagros Veliz

References

External links

Laksmi's Video at Youtube

1985 births
Living people
People from San Cristóbal, Táchira
Venezuelan female models
Miss Venezuela International winners
Miss International 2009 delegates
Venezuelan beauty pageant winners
Universidad Santa María (Venezuela) alumni